This is an incomplete list of Christian monasteries and religious houses, both extant and dissolved, in Finland, for both men and women.

Catholic

Dissolved 
 Dominican Priory, Turku (Turun dominikaanikonventti, Pyhän Olavin dominikaanikonventti), dedicated to Saint Olaf; founded by Swedish Dominicans in 1249; closed in the Reformation in 1529, and destroyed by fire in 1537
 Dominican Priory, Vyborg (Viipurin dominikaanikonventti); founded 1392; dissolved in the Reformation in the late 1530s
 Franciscan Friary, Vyborg (Viipurin fransiskaanikonventti); Franciscan friary, first mentioned in 1403; dissolved in the Reformation in the late 1530s
 Franciscan Friary, Rauma (Rauman fransiskaanikonventti), Rauma, Satakunta; founded probably in the 14th century but first recorded in 1449; dissolved during the Reformation in 1538
 Franciscan Friary, Kökar (Kökarin fransiskaanikonventti), Hamnö island, Kökar, Åland; founded in the 14th or 15th century but first recorded in 1472, dissolved during the Reformation by 1539
 Nådendal Abbey (Naantalin luostari), Naantali, Southwest Finland; Bridgettine abbey (the first religious house for women in Finland) founded in 1438; dissolved in the Reformation but not finally wound up until 1591
 Monastery of Our Lady of Mount Carmel in Finland (Jumalanäidin karmeliittaluostari), Espoo; Carmelite nunnery founded in 1988; closed in 2021

Extant 
 Bridgettine monastery, Turku (Turun birgittalaisluostari); Bridgettine nunnery founded in 1986

Eastern Orthodox

Old Believers 
 Pahkalammi Monastery (Pahkalammen luostari) in Pahkalammi, Vuottoniemi, in Ilomantsi, North Karelia; founded 1798 by Marki Alexandrov for monks and also later nuns of the Old Believers fleeing persecution in Russia; abandoned by 1880
 Megrijärvi Monastery, also Megri (Megrijärven luostari), in Ilomantsi, North Karelia, on the Russian border; founded c.1800 by Onefrei for Old Believers fleeing persecution in Russia, initially for monks, but from 1850 also for nuns; the state acquired the property in 1914 and the last resident, a nun, left in 1919
 Pyötikö Monastery (Pyötikön luostari) in Vuokko, Juuka, North Karelia; founded in 1847 for monks of the Old Believers fleeing persecution in Russia; closed 1890
 Tavajärvi Monastery (Tavajärven luostari) in Tavajärvi, Kuusamo; founded in the 1850s for monks of the Old Believers fleeing persecution in Russia after the destruction of the monastery at Tuoppajärvi in 1852; the last monks died in the 1920s

Finnish Orthodox 
 New Valamo Monastery (Valamon luostari or Uusi-Valamo), Pappiniemi, Heinävesi, North Karelia; monastery of the Finnish Orthodox Church; founded after 1940 by refugee monks from the original Valaam Monastery (on the island of Valaam, now in Russia)
 Lintula Holy Trinity Convent (Lintulan Pyhän Kolminaisuuden luostari or Lintulan luostari), Heinävesi, North Karelia; nunnery of the Finnish Orthodox Church; founded 1895 in Kivennapa (now in Russia); refounded in Heinävesi in 1946
 Pokrova Community (Pokrovan yhteisö), Kirkkonummi, Uusimaa; monastic community (without the formal status of a monastery) of the Finnish Orthodox Church; founded 1995 in the former Dannedbrog farm by the monk Hariton Tuukkanen

Lutheran 
 Monastic Community of Enonkoski (Enonkosken luostari), Ihamaniemi, South Savo; Lutheran monastic community / retreat centre founded in 1994

See also
 List of Christian monasteries in Denmark
 List of Christian monasteries in Norway
 List of Christian monasteries in Sweden

References

Further reading
 Salomies, Ilmari, 1962: Suomen kirkon historia ["History of the Church in Finland"], 3 vols., Helsinki: Otava

 
Christian monasteries
Finland religion-related lists
Finland